Alfonso Crippa (2 February 1905 – 4 December 1983) was an Italian racing cyclist. He rode in the 1929 Tour de France.

References

External links
 

1905 births
1983 deaths
Italian male cyclists
Place of birth missing
Cyclists from the Province of Varese
People from Gallarate